The Trout-Good Pine School, located at 1412 School Street in the unincorporated community of Good Pine near Jena in LaSalle Parish, Louisiana, was built in 1938. It was listed on the National Register of Historic Places on May 20, 1999.

Built by the Gremillion Brothers, it includes elements of Colonial Revival architecture at its doorways.

The school was built to replace its predecessor, which burned in a lightning-caused fire on June 27, 1937.  It is significant as a well-preserved example of a school still in use in 1999 with a historic interior.

See also
 National Register of Historic Places listings in LaSalle Parish, Louisiana

References

School buildings on the National Register of Historic Places in Louisiana
Colonial Revival architecture in Louisiana
School buildings completed in 1938
LaSalle Parish, Louisiana
Schools in LaSalle Parish, Louisiana